Cylindromyia interrupta is a species of fly in the family Tachinidae.

Distribution and habitat
This species is present in most of Europe, Russia and in North America ( Alaska to California,  North Dakota, Colorado and New Jersey). These tachinid flies live in hedge rows and dry meadows.

Description
Body is slender. Thorax is black, while the abdomen is reddish with two silver rings, a wide longitudinal black marking and black apical tergites. Hind tibiae have 1 or 2 posteroventral bristles. Apical scutellars are absent. The abdomen has median discal bristles on tergites 1, 2, 3 and 4. The bright white calypteres stand out.

Biology
Adults can be found from May to August. They mainly feed on nectar and pollen of Apiaceae (especially Leucanthemum vulgare). This tachnid fly parasitizes moths and true bugs (Hemiptera). The larvae develop inside the living host.

References

Phasiinae
Diptera of Europe
Insects described in 1824